Jameh Mosque of Natanz in the city of Natanz located in Isfahan province, all of which was built at the time of Öljaitü and his son Abu Sa'id Bahadur Khan. The buildings are different at different times, but the interval between them is small. The complex includes a Jameh Mosque and a Khanqah and the tomb of Abdussamad Esfahani and a 37-meter minaret.

Sources 

Mosques in Isfahan Province
Burial monuments and structures
Buildings and structures in Iran
National works of Iran
Mosque buildings with domes